Longwanggang River is a left-bank tributary of the Changsha section of Xiang River in Hunan Province, China. The river has two source streams, the north and south sources. Leifeng River is the north source stream, which rises in Liaojiaping. The south source is regarded as the main stream, it originates from Nanjiaoling, which is located in the eastern side of Wufeng Mountain of Lianhua, Yuelu District.

It runs generally west to east through Lianhua, Leifeng, Tianding, Meixihu, Wangchengpo and Xihu, joins Xiang River at Yingyinqiao Briage between Yinpenling and Wangyuehu subdistricts.

References

Rivers of Changsha
Tributaries of the Xiang River